William R. Wing Farm Complex is a historic home and farm complex located at Duanesburg in Schenectady County, New York. The farmhouse was built about 1836 and is a two-story, five bay frame building with late Federal / early Greek Revival vernacular design features. It has a gable roof, brick interior end chimneys, and a wide frieze pierced by full second story windows.  Also on the property are two contributing barns.

The property was covered in a 1984 study of Duanesburg historical resources.
It was listed on the National Register of Historic Places in 1984.

References

Houses on the National Register of Historic Places in New York (state)
Houses in Schenectady County, New York
Federal architecture in New York (state)
Greek Revival houses in New York (state)
Houses completed in 1836
National Register of Historic Places in Schenectady County, New York